During World War II, the United States Army Air Forces (USAAF) established numerous airfields in New York for training pilots and aircrews of USAAF fighters and bombers.

Most of these airfields were under the command of First Air Force or the Army Air Forces Training Command (AAFTC) (A predecessor of the current-day United States Air Force Air Education and Training Command).  However the other USAAF support commands (Air Technical Service Command (ATSC); Air Transport Command (ATC) or Troop Carrier Command) commanded a significant number of airfields in a support roles.

It is still possible to find remnants of these wartime airfields. Many were converted into municipal airports, some were returned to agriculture and several were retained as United States Air Force installations and were front-line bases during the Cold War. Hundreds of the temporary buildings that were used survive today, and are being used for other purposes.

Major airfields

Air Technical Service Command
 Buffalo MAP, Buffalo
 Joint use USAAF/Civil AirportAircraft modification center.
 Also contract flying school operated by Curtiss-Wright Corp.
 Now: Buffalo Niagara International Airport
 Farmingdale AAF, Farmingdale
 436th Army Air Force Base Unit
 Used by Republic Aircraft
 Now: Republic Airport 
 Niagara Falls MAP, Niagara Falls
 Aircraft modification center
 Niagara Falls International Airport and
  Niagara Falls Air Reserve Station
 Rome AAF, Rome
 420th Army Air Force Base Unit (Rome ASC)
 Was: Rome Air Force Base (1948)
 Was: Griffiss Air Force Base (1948-1991)
 Now:  Rome Laboratory (1991-Pres)
 Wheeler Sack Field AAF, Deferiet
 Sub-base of Rome AAF
 Supported Fort Drum
 Now: Wheeler-Sack Army Airfield, Active US Army Airfield.
 Syracuse AAB, Syracuse
 393d Army Air Force Base Unit (Rome ASC)
 Now: Syracuse Hancock International Airport 
  Hancock Field Air National Guard Base

Air Transport Command
 La Guardia Field, New York City
 523d Army Air Force Base Unit (Reduced)
 Joint use USAAF/Civil Airport
 Now: La Guardia Airport
 Albany MAP, Albany
 Joint use USAAF/Civil Airport
 Now: Albany International Airport

First Air Force
 Mitchel AAF, Garden City
 1st Army Air Force Base Unit
 Was: Mitchel Air Force Base (1947-1961)
 Now: Non-flying facility part of greater NYC urbanised area.
 Suffolk County AAF, Westhampton Beach
 437th Army Air Force Base Unit
 Was: Suffolk County Air Force Base (1947-1969)
 Was: Suffolk County Airport (1969-1991) and Suffolk County Air National Guard Base (1970-1991)
 Now: Francis S. Gabreski Airport and
  Francis S. Gabreski Air National Guard Base

Air Education and Training Command
 Stewart AAF, Newburgh
 320th Army Air Force Base Unit
 Supported United States Military Academy, West Point
 Was: Stewart Air Force Base (1947-1970)
 Now: Stewart International Airport and
  Stewart Air National Guard Base

References
 Maurer, Maurer (1983). Air Force Combat Units of World War II. Maxwell AFB, Alabama: Office of Air Force History. .
 Ravenstein, Charles A. (1984). Air Force Combat Wings Lineage and Honors Histories 1947-1977. Maxwell AFB, Alabama: Office of Air Force History. .
 Thole, Lou (1999), Forgotten Fields of America : World War II Bases and Training, Then and Now - Vol. 2.  Pictorial Histories Pub. 
 Military Airfields in World War II - New York

 01
World War II
World War II
United States World War II army airfields